A list of films produced in Hong Kong in 1963:.

1963

References

External links
 IMDB list of Hong Kong films
 Hong Kong films of 1963 at HKcinemamagic.com
 Hong Kong Filmography (1913-2006) at Hong Kong Film Archive

1963
Lists of 1963 films by country or language
Films